Koreans in Japan: Critical Voices from the Margin is a 2000 book edited by Sonia Ryang, published by Routledge. It discusses Zainichi Koreans in Japan.

Background
Sonia Ryang, born a stateless Zainichi Korean, previously wrote North Koreans in Japan: Language, Ideology, and Identity. As of 2001 she resides in the United States.

Contents

The book includes ten essays, each written by a different person. The authors include Japanese scholars and Americans of various ethnic backgrounds, including Japanese origins, Korean origins, and other origins. The former taught in Japan and received their professional training in Anglophone countries. The latter had experience living in Japan.

Chapters 1, 2, and 3 discuss how Zainichi Koreans are defined and how they were excluded from Japanese society.
 "The Politics of Legal Status" by Chikako Kashiwazaki
 Explores why Koreans residing in Japan for generations do not have Japanese citizenship
 "The North Korean Homeland of Koreans in Japan" by Sonia Ryang
 It discusses the treatment of Zainichi Koreans originating by both the North Korean and Japanese governments, including the condition of statelessness and how Zainichi, including some South Korea-origin Zainichi, were repatriated to North Korea. Yasunori Fukuoka (福岡 安則 Fukuoka Yasunori) of Saitama University  wrote that "In her scornful disdain for the treatment meted out to these people by both governments, one senses the powerful indignation of a scholar who was herself brought up as a Chongryun Korean."
 "Political Correctness, Postcoloniality, and the Self-Representation of "Koreanness" in Japan" by Koichi Iwabuchi
 It discusses how awareness of Zainichi Koreans increased after the release of the 1993 film Tsuki wa dotchi ni dete iru ("Where is the Moon?").

Chapters 4, 5, and 6 discuss works of literature. The works discussed are:
 Furuhausu - Yu Miri
 Ikaino Taryon - Chong Ch'u-wǒl
 Yuhi - Yi Jang-ji
The writers of these works are all Zainichi women.

Chapters 7, 8, and 9 discuss the post-World War II education of Zainichi children
 "Kids between Nations: Ethnic Classes in the Construction of Korean Identities in Japanese Public Schools'" by Jeffry T. Hester
 "Korean Children, Textbooks, and Educational Practices in Japanese Primary Schools'." by Reiko Aoki  - This essay examines Ningen, a publication edited by members Burakumin rights organization that is used by the human rights program of Osaka Prefecture, and a summer school in Hirakata, Osaka Prefecture that caters to Zainichi children. Yoshida argues that the former does not adequately cover Zainichi Korean issues since the editors are excessively focused on Burakumin, and that since the latter does not include ethnic Japanese children it is ineffective.

Hideki Harajiri of Shizuoka University wrote that the analyses use perspectives developed in English-language academia on Japanese materials instead of using perspectives from other language academia.

Reception

Kyeyoung Park of the University of California, Los Angeles wrote that it "is a well-written and much-needed volume on this
important topic" and that it "remains a provocative, engagingly written, and insightful book." Park argued that the book should have used "a clearer explanation of the continuing legal and socioeconomic constraints against Koreans", included "a more balanced discussion in terms of both structure and agency", and given more attention to other marginalized groups such as religious, regional, and economic minorities. In addition Park argued that the chapters were not sufficiently related to one another.

Fukuoka stated that this book "never quite delivers" on establishing "a portrait of the entire Zainichi population", and that it was not as good as North Koreans in Japan.

Harajiri wrote that "I can only conclude that the book contributes to and reaffirms the imbalance of power relations between the English-language and non-English-language academic worlds."

Sarah Soh Chung-Hee of San Francisco State University wrote that the book "is a most welcome addition to the scant literature on the topic in English and makes significant contributions to the knowledge on the important issues of identity in the study of diasporic community."

Notes

References
 Fukuoka, Yasunori (Saitama University). "Koreans in Japan: Critical Voices from the Margin, edited by Sonia Ryang. London and New York: Routledge, 2000, 229 pp., 90.00 (hardback )." Social Science Japan Journal, 2002, Vol.5(2), pp. 301–303.
 Harajiri, Hideki (Shizuoka University). "Koreans in Japan: Critical Voices from the Margin (Book Review)." Pacific Affairs, 1 July 2003, Vol.76(2), pp. 312–314. Available from JSTOR.
 Park, Kyeyoung (University of California, Los Angeles). "Koreans in Japan: Critical Voices from the Margin" (Book Review). Journal of Japanese Studies, 1 July 2001, Vol.27(2), pp. 469–473. Available at JSTOR.
 Soh, Sarah Chung-Hee (San Francisco State University). "Koreans in Japan: Critical Voices from the Margin" (review) Anthropological Quarterly, 2001, Vol.74(1), pp. 42–43. Available on JSTOR.

Further reading
 Grinker, Roy Richard (George Washington University). "Koreans in Japan: Critical Voices from the Margin." The Journal of Asian Studies, 2002, Vol.61(1), pp. 280–281.
 Hurh, Won Moo. "Koreans in Japan: Critical Voices from the Margin.(Review)." Ethnic and Racial Studies, March, 2001, Vol.24(2), p. 340(2).
 Uchiyamada, Yasushi. "Koreans in Japan: Critical Voices from the Margin" (Book Review). The Journal of the Royal Anthropological Institute, 1 September 2004, Vol.10(3), pp. 748–749.

2000 non-fiction books
Zainichi Korean culture